Fortune Institute of Technology (FIT) is a private university in Daliao District and Cishan District of Kaohsiung, Taiwan.

History
FIT was founded on 5 July 1989 as Fortune Junior College of Industry in Cishan Township, Kaohsiung County. In 1991, it was renamed Fortune Junior College of Technology and Commerce. In 1998, the Daliao Campus was established in Daliao Township. In 1999, the junior college was upgraded as Fortune Institute of Technology. In 2002, the second campus in of Daliao Campus was established and was subsequently renamed Dafa Campus. In 2019, the collage had an enrollment rate of 58.10%. In September 2022, the Ministry of Education ordered the university to close by May 2023 due to poor financial and academic performances.

Campuses
 Dafa Campus
 Daliao Campus
 Chishan Campus

Faculties
 College of Business and Management
 College of Design
 College of Electrical and Computer Engineering
 College of Food and Beverage Management

See also
 List of universities in Taiwan

References

1989 establishments in Taiwan
Educational institutions established in 1989
Universities and colleges in Kaohsiung